The Devil's Double is a lost 1916 silent film western directed by and starring William S. Hart. It was produced by the New York Motion Picture Company and released through Triangle Film Corporation.

Cast
 William S. Hart - Bowie Blake
 Enid Markey - Naomi Tarleton
 Robert McKim - Van Dyke Tarleton
 Kisaburo Kurihara - Jose Ramirez (* as Thomas Kurihara)

References

External links
 
 
 lobby poster

1916 films
1916 Western (genre) films
1916 lost films
American black-and-white films
Films directed by William S. Hart
Lost American films
Lost Western (genre) films
Silent American Western (genre) films
1910s American films
1910s English-language films